License to Kill is a 1984 television film directed by Jud Taylor. It stars James Farentino and Penny Fuller.  It was released on DVD in 2008 by Echo Bridge Home Entertainment.

Plot
John and Judith Peterson's world is shattered when their daughter Lynne is killed by a drunk driver on the same day she graduates from high school and receives an award for safe driving. John becomes obsessed with seeing Tom Fiske, the arrogant businessman who caused the accident and who shows no remorse, punished for his crime. Fiske hires a crafty defense attorney who delays the trial repeatedly and succeeds in having his blood sample showing his inebriation suppressed as evidence. However dogged prosecutor Martin Sawyer prevails by entering into evidence Fiske's bar bill on the day of the accident showing his consumption of martinis as proof of his inebriation. Justice prevails when Fiske is sentenced to prison.

Production

Both Farentino and Murray are said to have swapped roles early on during principal photography.

Cast
James Farentino as John Peterson
Penny Fuller as Judith Peterson
Don Murray as Tom Fiske
Millie Perkins as Mary Fiske
Ari Meyers as Amy Peterson
Kristen Vigard as Lynne Peterson
Denzel Washington as Martin Sawyer
George Martin as Steve

Home media
The film was released in Australia as a double feature DVD with Resting Place by Payless Entertainment.

References

External links

1984 television films
1984 films
American television films
Films directed by Jud Taylor
Films scored by Laurence Rosenthal